Ragna Thiis Stang (15 September 1909 – 29 March 1978) was a Norwegian historian and museum administrator.

Biography
She was born in Kristiania (now Oslo), Norway. She was a daughter of museum director  Jens Thiis and his wife Vilhelmine Dons. Her brother was architect  Helge Thiis.

After graduating artium at Oslo in 1929, she studied art history at the University of Oslo. She also conducted several study trips to Belgium, France, Greece and Germany . She stayed at the Swedish Archaeological Institute in Rome from 1934-35. In 1937 she took her master's degree in art history. She received  her doctorate in 1960.

Stang was appointed at the Norwegian Museum of Cultural History from 1938 to 1944. From 1947 she was manager of the Vigeland Museum at Frogner.  In 1966 Stang took over as director of the Oslo City Art Collections (Oslo kommunes kunstsamlinger) and from 1968 she was responsible for the Munch Museum at Tøyen. She published a biography of Gustav Vigeland in 1965, and a biography of Edvard Munch in 1977.

Personal life
In 1934, she was married to art historian Nic. Stang (1908-1971). Their daughter Tove Stang Dahl (1938–93) became a legal scholar and married historian Hans Fredrik Dahl. Their other daughter, Nina Thiis Stang (1944–78), worked for NORAD.
She and her daughter Nina died in a car accident on a road from Nairobi to Mombasa in Kenya on 29 March 1978.

Selected works
De store billedhuggere og borgerrepublikken Firenze (1959)
 Gustav Vigeland. En kunstner og hans verk (1965) 
 Edvard Munch. Mennesket og kunstneren (1977)

References

1909 births
1978 deaths
Writers from Oslo
University of Oslo alumni
20th-century Norwegian historians
Norwegian biographers
Directors of museums in Norway
Women museum directors
20th-century biographers
Road incident deaths in Kenya